The North Carolina Wing of the Civil Air Patrol is headquartered in Burlington, North Carolina.  It serves to administer the operation of the volunteers within the state to accomplish the three congressionally mandated missions of the organization: 1) Emergency Services, 2) Cadet Programs, and 3) Aerospace Education.

History

The North Carolina Wing was created on December 9, 1941, by Governor J. Melville Broughton, and the Wing held its first meeting on December 30 of that year. By the end of January 1942, the wing had approximately 350 members and over one hundred aircraft. During World War II, the North Carolina Wing was responsible for assisting in fighting a forest fire, dropping paper bombs to simulate air raids, conducting evaluation flights during blackout drills, and spotting U-boats off the North Carolina shore.

In May 2020, members of the North Carolina Wing were activated to support North Carolina's response to the 2020 coronavirus pandemic. North Carolina Wing members staffed two North Carolina Department of Emergency Management field warehouses, providing logistics and administrative support. Members also conducted transport missions in support of the North Carolina Department of Emergency Management. By 6 May 2020, North Carolina Wing members had conducted over 500 transport missions, totaling over 40,000 miles of intrastate travel. In March 2021, members of North Carolina Wing provided support at vaccine points of distribution.

Squadrons in North Carolina Wing 

North Carolina Wing has thirty composite, senior, or cadet squadrons as well as four senior flights chartered in the state and assigned to one of six groups. There are also three non-standard squadrons (000, 001, and 999) under North Carolina Wing Headquarters.

North Carolina Wing Aircraft 
North Carolina Wing has ten aircraft based in the state.  They are kept in a state of readiness to respond to emergency services missions and are positioned based on need and availability of pilots.  Major aircraft maintenance is performed centrally at Sanford Airport (TTA) while minor maintenance and repairs are performed at basing locations as required.  Aircraft are also used to provide orientation flights to cadets and develop proficiency and training of CAP pilots.

See also
North Carolina Air National Guard
North Carolina State Defense Militia

References

Further reading
 Blazich, Frank A. “North Carolina's Flying Volunteers: The Civil Air Patrol in World War II, 1941-1944.” The North Carolina Historical Review.

External links 
 ncwgcap.org
 gocivilairpatrol.com
 capmembers.com

Wings of the Civil Air Patrol